1st Tupchanovo (1-se Töpsän) is a rural locality (a village) in Yuldybaievsky Selsoviet of Kugarchinsky District, Russia. The population was 126 as of 2010.

Geography 
1st Tupchanovo is located 12 km southeast of Mrakovo (the district's administrative centre) by road. Ibragimovo is the nearest rural locality.

Ethnicity 
The village is inhabited by Bashkirs and others.

Streets 
 Davletova
 Z. Validi
 Olo Ik

References

External links 
 1st Tupchanovo on travellers.ru
 Council of Municipalities of the Republic of Bashkortostan

Rural localities in Kugarchinsky District